Wolf Creek may refer to:

Bodies of water

Missouri
 Wolf Creek (Beaver Creek tributary)
 Wolf Creek (Cane Creek tributary)
 Wolf Creek (Cave Creek tributary)
 Wolf Creek (Elkhorn Creek tributary)
 Wolf Creek (South Grand River tributary)
 Wolf Creek (St. Francis River tributary)
 Wolf Creek (Taney County, Missouri)
 Wolf Creek (Thompson River tributary)
 Wolf Creek (Tuque Creek tributary)

Montana
 Wolf Creek (Lewis and Clark County, Montana), a tributary of the Missouri River
 Wolf Creek (McCone County, Montana), a tributary of the Redwater River in McCone County
 Wolf Creek (Roosevelt County, Montana), a tributary of the Missouri River in Roosevelt County

Ohio
 Wolf Creek (Great Miami River tributary), a tributary of the Great Miami River
 Wolf Creek (Muskingum River tributary), a tributary of the Muskingum River
 Wolf Creek (Sandusky River)

Other states
 Wolf Creek (Nevada County, California), a tributary of the Bear River
 Wolf Creek (Mineral County, Colorado), a tributary of the West Fork San Juan River
 Wolf Creek (Rocky Creek tributary), a stream in Georgia
 Wolf Creek (Iowa), a tributary of the Cedar River in Grundy and Black Hawk Counties
 Wolf Creek (Minnesota), a tributary of the Cedar River in Mower County
 Wolf Creek (southern Minnesota), a tributary of the Cannon River in Rice County
 Wolf Creek (New York), a tributary of Genesee River
 Wolf Creek (Oklahoma), a tributary of the North Canadian River in Oklahoma and Texas
 Wolf Creek (Northkill Creek), a tributary of Northkill Creek in Berks County, Pennsylvania
 Wolf Creek (Slippery Rock Creek tributary), west Pennsylvania
 Wolf Creek (Beech River tributary), Tennessee
 Wolf Creek (Duck River), in Hickman County, Tennessee
 Wolf Creek (New River tributary), in Virginia
 Wolf Creek (Virginia), a tributary of the North Fork of the Holston River in Virginia
 Wolf Creek (Greenbrier River), a stream in West Virginia

Canada
 Wolf Creek (Timiskaming District), a stream in Ontario
 Wolf Creek Research Basin, Yukon River Basin, northwestern Canada

Cities and towns
 Wolf Creek, Louisville, Jefferson County, Kentucky
 Wolf Creek, Montana, an unincorporated community
 Wolf Creek, Ohio, an unincorporated community
 Wolf Creek, Oregon, a town
 Wolf Creek, South Dakota, a community in Pine Ridge, South Dakota
 Wolf Creek, Utah
 Wolf Creek, Wisconsin, an unincorporated community

Film and television
 Wolf Creek (film), a 2005 independent Australian horror film
 Wolf Creek 2, a 2013 sequel Australian horror film
 Wolf Creek (TV series), a 2016 Australian television series

Other uses
 Wolf Creek Dam, on the Cumberland River in Kentucky
 Wolf Creek Nuclear Generating Station in Kansas
 Wolf Creek Pass, a mountain pass in Colorado
 Wolf Creek State Park in Illinois
 Wolf Creek ski area in Colorado
 Wolf Creek Reservoir, within the Elkhorn Mountains, Oregon
 Wolf Mountain, Wolf Creek Utah Ski Resort

See also
Wolfcreek, West Virginia
Wolfe Creek, Western Australia